Between Strangers is a 2002 film, written and directed by Edoardo Ponti, son of Sophia Loren, the first time they worked together.

Cast
 Sophia Loren as Olivia
 Mira Sorvino as Natalia Bauer
 Deborah Kara Unger as Catherine
 Pete Postlethwaite as John
 Julian Richings as Nigel
 Klaus Maria Brandauer as Alexander Bauer
 Malcolm McDowell as Alan Baxter
 Gérard Depardieu as Max
 Wendy Crewson as Amanda Trent 
 Len Doncheff as Grocery Store Owner
 Corey Sevier as Jeb

Plot
Three women in Toronto confront emotional crises regarding the men in their lives. Olivia (Sophia Loren) looks after her husband John (Pete Postlethwaite), a wheelchair user. Olivia has aspired to a career as an artist but John refused to hear of her wasting her time. Olivia finds encouragement from an unlikely source, Max (Gérard Depardieu), an eccentric French gardener.

Natalia (Mira Sorvino) is a news photographer who, on assignment in Angola, took a portrait of a crying child orphaned by war. Her father Alexander (Klaus Maria Brandauer), also a well-known photojournalist, is proud of Natalia when her photo appears on the cover of a news magazine, but she is haunted by the fact that while she made the child famous, she couldn't save her life.

Catherine (Deborah Kara Unger) has never been able to resolve her hatred of her father, Alan (Malcolm McDowell), who beat her mother to death when she was young. When Alan is released from prison, she's willing to abandon her husband, children and career as a musician to track him down and kill him, unable to accept that he's a changed man.

References

External links
 
 

2002 films
2002 drama films
Canadian drama films
Italian drama films
English-language Canadian films
English-language Italian films
Films scored by Zbigniew Preisner
2000s English-language films
2000s Canadian films